Tammie Souza is a multiple Emmy-winning meteorologist, working at WCAU-TV in Philadelphia, Pennsylvania, from March 2017 until December 2019.

Personal life

Souza was born in Pittsburgh, Pennsylvania, and raised in San Diego, California. She received a Bachelor of Science in biology from San Diego State University, and is completing graduate studies for a master's degree in applied meteorology from Mississippi State University and has received a certification from Mississippi State University's broadcast meteorology program. She earned a pilot's license while in college.

Souza, her husband and their son moved from the Chicago area to Lower Merion Township, Pennsylvania, in 2017.

Broadcast career
Souza began her career as the morning and noon meteorologist at KHSL in Chico, California. She then became chief meteorologist at WDJT in Milwaukee, Wisconsin. Souza later moved to Chicago, where she worked six years at WMAQ, and two years at WTSP in Tampa, Florida. While at WMAQ, she was known for recruiting viewers to provide temperature and rainfall as "weather watchers", and for visiting of grade schools with an interactive and educational weather presentation called Weather With Class.

After the death of Dick Fletcher, WTSP's longtime chief meteorologist, Souza was hired to be the station's chief meteorologist.

Souza's sister, Patty, was a meteorologist for WTSP's sister station KXTV. At one point, Tammie and Patty Souza were the only siblings in the United States who delivered weather on television.

Souza is one of a handful of women nationwide that holds both the prestigious AMS/CBM Seal and the NWA Seal and sits on the boards of both the American Meteorological Society and the National Weather Association.

In March 2017, she joined Comcast-NBC-owned WCAU (NBC 10) in Philadelphia, Pennsylvania. Her last day at WCAU was December 6, 2019.

In January 2020, she began what is expected to be a brief stint filling in for vacationing regulars at Philadelphia's CBS3.

In August 2020, she began a brief stint filling in at WBBM-TV CBS2 in Chicago. She will still fill in at Philadelphia's CBS3.

Awards and nominations
Souza has received 17 Emmy nominations and six Emmy Awards, including Best Weathercast, Best Weather and Science Report and for Special Live Reporting, as well as a first place award from the Associated Press for a report on Shipwreck Diving in Lake Michigan. The National Association of Black Journalists recognized her with a nomination for her story about fugitive slave ships on Lake Michigan.

Acting career
Prior to her career in broadcast meteorology, Souza had several small acting roles.

Filmography

Television

References

External links
Official WTSP biography

Official Twitter page

Living people
Year of birth missing (living people)
American people of Portuguese descent
American television meteorologists
Television anchors from Tampa, Florida
San Diego State University alumni
Mississippi State University alumni